Khaled Haj Youssef (born 12 January 1989) is a Tunisian handball player for Al Sadd and the Tunisian national team.

He participated at the 2016 Summer Olympics.

References

External links

1989 births
Living people
Tunisian male handball players
Handball players at the 2016 Summer Olympics
Olympic handball players of Tunisia
Expatriate handball players
Tunisian expatriate sportspeople in Qatar
Competitors at the 2018 Mediterranean Games
Mediterranean Games silver medalists for Tunisia
Mediterranean Games medalists in handball
21st-century Tunisian people
20th-century Tunisian people